Satahovci is a village in the Municipality of Murska Sobota in the Prekmurje region of Slovenia.

Name
Satahovci was attested in written sources as Zetekolcz in 1365. The Slovene name Satahovci (like the Hungarian name Muraszentes and older Szvetahócz or Szvetehócz) is derived from the adjective *svętъ 'holy, sacred', referring to a consecrated place. In older sources, Satahovci is also attested in Slovene as Setovci, Svetovci, and Svetahovci.

Cultural heritage
There is a small chapel in the settlement dedicated to the Holy Spirit. It was built in 1852 and has a belfry with an onion-domed copper-covered roof.

References

External links
Satahovci on Geopedia

Populated places in the City Municipality of Murska Sobota